Wehrbach may refer to:

Wehrbach (Nidda), a river of Hesse, Germany, tributary of the Nidda
two rivers of the Englischer Garten, Munich, Bavaria, Germany
Oberer Wehrbach
Unterer Wehrbach